LeMay - America's Car Museum is a museum in the city of Tacoma, Washington. The museum is adjacent to the Tacoma Dome and opened on June 2, 2012. Many of the cars on display were donated to the museum by the family of Harold LeMay.

Details

Harold LeMay owned a successful refuse company, Harold LeMay Enterprises, within the Tacoma metro area and amassed the world's largest private car collection. After his death, the city of Tacoma donated  of land next to the Tacoma Dome for the museum that would contain some of his car collection. The majority of the collection remains at the LeMay Family Collection at Marymount in nearby Spanaway. The museum has  of exhibit space, and contains a 350-car gallery showing cars notable for their speed, technology and design, as well as their importance to car culture. The building also contains gift shops, restoration shops, lecture halls, galleries, a banquet room, and a café.

From the mezzanine level, main level, and outside patio, there are views of Downtown Tacoma, Thea Foss Waterway, Commencement Bay, and the Olympic Mountains. Outside the museum is a  courtyard and clubhouse for car clubs. The outdoor area is suitable for hosting car shows, auctions, swap meets, car club events, new car launches, and a concours d'Elegance.

The museum has had "Club Auto" satellite locations in Tacoma, Kirkland, Washington, and Lakewood, Colorado.

Donors and sponsors
The projected cost of the museum is $100 million. Harold LeMay's wife, Nancy LeMay, donated $15 million to the museum. The land donated to the museum by the City of Tacoma is estimated to be worth $17 million.

The American Automobile Association (AAA) of Washington made the largest corporate donation to date with its 2008 commitment of $1.6 million.
Other major museum sponsors are Bonhams, Boeing, The News Tribune, and State Farm Insurance. Other donors include various car collectors, auto clubs and citizens worldwide.

The architect for the museum is the Los Angeles-based firm LARGE architecture. JTM Construction of Seattle was the general contractor for the museum.

References

External links

 LeMay America's Car Museum

Automobile museums in Washington (state)
Museums in Tacoma, Washington
Museums established in 2012
2012 establishments in Washington (state)